"Leningrad" is a 1989 song written and performed by American singer and songwriter Billy Joel. The song was originally released on his album Storm Front on the Columbia Records label, and went on to be released as a single in Europe only. It was also released on his Greatest Hits, Vol. 3 compilation. The song title is derived from the contemporary name of St. Petersburg, Russia.

Synopsis
The song was written by Joel about a Russian clown named Viktor Razinov, whom he met while touring the Soviet Union in 1987. Throughout the song, major items of Viktor's and Billy's lives are compared to show the cultural differences and similarities of the United States and the Soviet Union.

In the song, Billy describes Viktor's life as one of many Soviet children who lost fathers during World War II, specifically during the siege of Leningrad. He enlisted in the Red Army, drank vodka to fight the pain, and then became a circus clown, bringing joy to Russian children.

Billy described his childhood life as being "born in '49, a Cold War kid in McCarthy time". He briefly describes his life living in Levittown, and the fear of the Cuban Missile Crisis. Billy also makes a reference to the Korean War, a proxy war to the Cold War, as well as the Vietnam War.

In the end, the two meet after Billy's Leningrad concert (Viktor had journeyed across Russia to see all six of the Russian concerts), where Viktor draws a laugh from Billy's daughter Alexa. Billy and Viktor embrace afterwards. In the song's last line, Billy sings: "We never knew what friends we had, until we came to Leningrad."

The quote is printed on the single cover, but not on the cover of the 4-track CD, which instead features the titles of the extra songs: "Goodnight Saigon", "Vienna", and "Scandinavian Skies".

In 2015, Razinov traveled to New York to see Billy Joel's concert in Madison Square Garden. For this reunion, Joel played "Leningrad", which he rarely plays live.

Charts

Weekly charts

Year-end charts

See also
List of anti-war songs

References

External links
"Leningrad" official video

Billy Joel songs
1989 singles
Songs written by Billy Joel
Songs about cities
Songs about Russia
Columbia Records singles
1989 songs

Cultural depictions of Russian men